St. Catherine High School is a Catholic co-educational traditional high school in the civic parish of St Catherine, Jamaica. It was founded by a Mercy sister and a Jesuit priest in 1948.

History

Founding
The idea of establishing a Catholic High School in Spanish Town originated with Father Matthew Ashe S.J. and Sister Mary Mercedes Doorley R.S.M., who saw the need to establish a school for children in St Catherine -with the potential- who were unable to gain places in the traditional grammar schools in Spanish Town and Kingston.

The school was originally intended to be a co-educational Catholic High School and it was established on the Catholic ideal of the total development of the student with a focus on student-centred learning.

Father Matthew Ashe S.J. (1911–1990) arrived in Jamaica on 27 August 1945, with no inkling that he would later be involved in starting a high school in Spanish Town. His first assignment was with the St. Anne's Church located on Percy Street in Kingston. In September 1947, he was transferred to St Joseph's Church in Spanish Town to replace Father Gildy S.J".

Upon his arrival in Spanish Town, Father Gildy gave him a letter encouraging him to do "something for the Spanish Town mission".  There was a big reception held for him at St. Catherine Primary. No sooner had Father Ashe arrived in Spanish Town than plans were afoot to start a Catholic high school.

Around the same time Sister Mary Mercedes Doorly R.S.M. (1884–1972), a Jamaican who was running the St Anthony's Academy, a Secondary School in Port Antonio, was forced to close the school due to financial difficulties. She left the parish of Portland along with her two assistants, Mrs. Erma Blackman (née Campbell) and Mrs. Cynthia Jacobs (née Hedman), determined to open a new secondary school in Spanish Town. St. Catherine High is a continuation and solidification of Sr. Mercedes’ mission, starting with St. Anthony's Academy, which she had established in 1921.

Sister Mercedes approached Father Ashe about collaborating to form a school and he immediately agreed.  Although Father Ashe thought the odds were against them in starting the school, he nevertheless stated: "one had to look at the immediate future ... Spanish Town [had] so many townships and hamlets clustered about it far and wide [that it] possessed a great potential for a secondary school."

They sought Bishop Thomas Emmet's approval to start the new school; he was initially reluctant, but subsequently approved the plan for a second high school in Spanish Town.

First location: White Church Street
In the 1948 academic year, a Catholic high school named after the parish of St Catherine opened its doors with twenty three students: ten boys in the traditional khaki uniforms and thirteen girls in the original red and white tunics and straw hats. St. Catherine High School began as a co-educational institution on the same premises that now house St Catherine Primary School at 34 White Church Street. Maria Thompson was the first and only student registered in the first term and was later joined by the others in the second term. She was recruited by Sr. Mary Fidelis-Neary RSM and came from the Cathedral High School for Girls (later St. Jago). As the numbers increased, the need for additional space became necessary.

Second location- Brunswick Avenue
In 1951, the school moved to the Convent at 5 Brunswick Street, the present site of St. Catherine Preparatory and Basic Schools. By then, it had become an all girls school.

Soon after the school started, Sister Mercedes retired due to ill-health and returned to the Alpha Convent in Kingston.  Sister Mary Clare Burns R.S.M. replaced her as principal of the school.

In 1954, Sister Mary Stanislaus Warburton (later Sister Anne Maries), a native of England, became the principal of the school. In a relatively short time the first results of students taking Senior Cambridge Exam showed a high percentage of pupils passing their exams; a number of students received credits and distinctions.

It was around this time in the early 1950s that the house system was introduced and the first graduation ceremony took place in 1955.

Sister Stanislaus' Superiors of her Order considered that the fledgling school would not survive as it could not compete with Grant-in-Aid Schools that received government subsidies and paid teachers better salaries. Tuition fees were not increased. Nevertheless, the Superiors were persuaded to keep the school open as Father Ashe along with others applied for Grant-in-Aid status, approved in 1958 by Minister of Education Florizel Glasspole, who later became Governor General of Jamaica.

Between 1959 and 1962 Sister Mary Pauline Mallette R.S.M. (Sister Carol), a Jamaican, acted as principal of the school while Sister Stanislaus went on to study in the United States. Sister Stanislaus returned to the school to resume her duties as principal.  In 1962, she became principal of Mount St. Joseph's Academy in Mandeville.

In 1959 Father Ashe left Spanish Town because of ill health; he later became one of the founding teachers and treasurer at Campion College in Kingston. Father Frances Jackmaugh, a Jesuit of Lithuanian descent who previously served in Kingston at St. Anne's Church and Highgate at Sacred Heart Church, assumed Father Ashe's position at St. Joseph's Church. He took an interest in the school and through his efforts land was purchased at 35 St. John's Road Spanish Town to build a new school.

Final location: St. John's Road 

In March 1960, the St. Catherine High School for Girls was moved to its present address which at the time was described as a "spacious and well kept campus" at 35 St John's Road.  The subjects offered at the school included cookery, literature, Latin, Spanish, Chemistry, Biology, Physics and various business subjects.

In 1962 Sister Mary Paschal-Figueroa R.S.M., was transferred from Alpha Academy in Kingston to become the successor of Sister Stanislaus. Sister Paschal, a Jamaican of Panamanian roots, had previously been Headmistress of Alpha Academy in Kingston and was the principal of Mount St. Joseph Academy, a secondary school in Mandeville.  Father Ashe described Sister Paschal as "warm-hearted [but] a strict disciplinarian".  Upon her arrival, Sister Paschal had to repay debts the school owed for buildings that were constructed prior to her arrival; she organised fund-raising and benefit dinners.

Under Sister Paschal's leadership, the school continued to maintain high educational standards despite the rapidly increasing student enrolment.  Father Ashe recalled, "students began to converge on St. Catherine High School not only from the immediate environs of Spanish Town but additionally from ever-widening radius of hinterlands" Part of this new growth was the inclusion of a boys' school in 1972. This was sited south of the girls high school at what is now the Junior Campus and was started with the transfer of boys from the St. Catherine All-Age department. Permission was obtained from Archbishop John J. McEleney, S.J. and Sister Paschal's Superior to convert St. Catherine High School into a co-educational school.

In 1978, Paschal Hall (named after Sister Paschal) was officially dedicated.

Under Sister Paschal, the school introduced industrial arts for the boys. She wrote the school's song "Dear St. Catherine High We Love You". 6th form was first introduced at this time, preparing students for the GCE Advanced Level exams.

Sister Paschal was later summoned to St. Joseph's Hospital in Kingston to rescue it from financial troubles, and became the last nun Administrator for St. Joseph's Hospital in Kingston. In 2005 the Government of Jamaica honoured Sister Paschal with the Order of Distinction (OD) for her work in the fields of education and healthcare.

In 1979 Madge Anderson, a vice-principal at the school, succeeded Sister Paschal as principal. Ms. Anderson also assumed the presidency of the Jamaica Catholic Education Association. She retired in 1987 passing the baton of leadership on to Mrs. Christabel Augustus-Fuller. Serving until 1993, she oversaw the construction of The Matthew Ashe Building on the Junior Campus. Named in honour of a founding father, it added eight new classrooms and other facilities to the plant. Following was Mrs. Colleen Brown who served as principal from 1993 to 1999. Mrs. Joan Tyser-Mills OD. JP. served as principal from 1999 to 2008. A notable achievement during her tenure was the historic 2005 Manning Cup team that reached the semifinals of the competition. She also opened the Guidance Center on the Senior Campus and started to beautify the campus by planting many Royal Palm trees. Ms. Claudia Neale, alumnae, acted as principal for the 2008-2009 academic year. 

In 2009 history was created when the first male principal, Mr. Marlon Campbell, was appointed to the helm of the school. In 2015 the aesthetics of the campus was improved when the Lascelles Williams Park was opened and dedicated to the school's long time serving chairman and alumnus (he was in the first class of students that entered the school). It provides a space for recreational activities and dining.

Curriculum

As a secondary school in Jamaica, St. Catherine High follows the traditional English grammar school model used throughout the British West Indies, incorporating the optional year 12 and 13, collectively known as sixth form. The first year of secondary school is regarded as first form, or Year Seven, and the subsequent year groups are numbered in increasing order up to sixth form. Students in the sixth form (years twelve and thirteen) are prepared for their CXC CAPE examinations.

Insignia

School crest
The school's crest is a shield with deep sky blue fill which represents truth and loyalty. Within the shield is the school's abbreviation above which is a banner and a Latin cross which symbolises faith. The periphery of the shield carries the school's name and motto.

Motto
The school's motto is Preces et Opera Omnia Vincunt and is translated "Prayer and Work Conquer All." The motto (Latin) is actually pronounced 'prae-kes et op-ay-ra om-nia wing-kunt'.

The rally cry from one Catherinite to another is simply "Preces!"

Nickname
The nickname "Catherine" is the shortened version of the school's official name.

Principals
The first five principals of St. Catherine High were Sisters of Mercy, the cofounders of the school. Afterwards, the school entered into a phase of laity and interdenominational leadership. Mr. Marlon Campbell, the institution's present and first male principal, is the second longest serving person in the position, having assumed that office in September 2009.

Houses

St. Catherine High has 6 houses. This is two more than the original four started in the early 1950s that were all named in honour of women Saints, most likely because the school was an all-girls institution presided over by nuns. Since then two of the Sisters of Mercy principals have been honoured with houses in their name. Listed below are the six:

Notable alumni

Politics & Governance
Most Honourable Andrew Holness, O.N., P.C., M.P., Prime Minister of Jamaica
Most Honourable Juliet Holness, O.N., M.P. Member of Parliament for East Rural St. Andrew and Deputy Speaker of the Lower Houses of Parliament 
Denise Daley, M.P. Member of Parliament for East St. Catherine and Shadow Minister of Local Government and Community Development
The Hon. Icylin Golding, C.D., Custos of St. Catherine 
Dr. Karren Dunkley, Global Jamaica Diaspora Council Representative, North-east USA
Shane Dalling, Chief Executive Officer- Firearm Licensing Authority (FLA)
Sharon Baugh-Burnett Deputy Director of the Overseas Examinations Commission.

Religion & Civil Society
Most Reverend Kenneth Richards, D.D., O.D., J.P., Roman Catholic Archbishop of Kingston

The Arts
Spice, international Dancehall artist
Chronixx, international Reggae artist
Dr. Monika Potts-Lawrence, Founder Stella Maris Dance Ensemble; Choreographer at the National Dance Theatre Company

Media & Communications
Dennis Brooks, Senior Communications Strategist at Jamaica Constabulary Force; formerly of Nationwide News Network- journalist and presenter
Dashan Hendricks, Jamaica Observer Business Content Manager, TVJ Journalist and News Editor
Denise Walters, TVJ Sports Journalist
Neika Lewis, Managing Editor and Senior Reporter- CVM TV

Banking & Finance
Rohan Miller, Head of Treasury at Sagicor Financial Corporation; former President & CEO of Sagicor Real Estate X-Fund; former CEO of Sagicor Investments; former Director at the Jamaica Stock Exchange

Academia
Professor Colin Gyles, Acting President- University of Technology, Jamaica; Dean of the Faculty of Science and Sport.
Dr. Fay Brown, Director of Child and Adolescent Development, Child Study Center at Yale University
Dr. Jennifer Yee-Sing former Principal Lecturer- University of Technology, Jamaica.
Dr. Kelling Donald Associate Dean, Professor of Chemistry- University of Richmond, Virginia.

Industry & Commerce
Albert Gordon, General Manager at Nevis Electricity Company Limited. Former CEO- Guyana Power & Light Inc., Director-General- Office of Utilities Regulation (OUR) and President- National Water Commission (NWC)
Wayne McKenzie, O.D., President & CEO at Jamaica Private Power Company Ltd.
Emma Subratie, CEO and Managing Director- Hema Luxe Limited and Pandora Spa And Wellness Ltd; Founding Member- Spa Association of Jamaica.

Medicine & Health Care
Kevin Allen, CEO- University Hospital of the West Indies
Dr. Jacqueline Goulbourne Gerontologist and Personal & Professional Development Officer, Faculty of Medical Sciences, UWI Mona.

Law
The Hon. Mrs. Icolin M. Reid, Supreme Court judge
Jennifer Housen, Managing Attorney-at-Law at Caribbean Legal

References 

Educational institutions established in 1948
Catholic schools in Jamaica
1948 establishments in Jamaica
Buildings and structures in Saint Catherine Parish